Quality Leadership University (QLU) is a private university founded in Panama City, Republic of Panama on February 18, 1997 and authorized to operate in Panama by Executive Decree. It is located in 45th Street, Bella Vista in Panama City. It’s accredited by the Consejo Nacional de Evaluacion y Acreditacion Universitaria de Panama (CONEAUPA). All its programs are approved by the Comision Tecnica de Fiscalizacion de Panama.

History 
Quality Leadership University (QLU) was founded on February 18, 1997 by Oscar Leon. More than 1,500 Panamanian and Latinamerican professionals have graduated in undergraduate and graduate programs. It was first located in Credicorp Building in 50th Street and the first program offered was a Master of Education in Training and Development in academic agreement with the University of Louisville.

Memberships 
 Consejo Latinoamericano de Escuelas de Administración, CLADEA
 Asociación de Universidades Privadas de Panamá, AUPPA
 Asociación de Universidades Privadas de Centro América, AUPRICA
 The Association to Advance Collegiate School of Business, AACSB International
 Accreditation Council of Business School and Programs, ACBSP
 Cámara de Comercio, Industrias y Agricultura de Panama, CCIAP
 American Chamber of Commerce Panama

Agreements with other Universities 
 University of Louisville, Kentucky
 Illinois State University, Illinois
 Towson University, Maryland
 Florida International University, Miami
 Universidad de Chile, Santiago de Chile
 Universidad Politécnica de Madrid, Madrid
 University of South Florida, Tampa

Academic programs 
Graduate:
 Master of Business Administration
 Master of Engineering Management
 Master of Business Marketing
 Master of Construction Management
 Master of Science in Human Resources Management and Development
 Master of Digital Marketing and Social Media
 Master of Finance
Undergraduate:
 Bachelor of Science in Business Management
 Bachelor of Science in Business Marketing
 Bachelor of Science in International Business
 Bachelor of Arts in Communication Science

Private universities in Panama
Buildings and structures in Panama City
Education in Panama City